Mike or Michael Flanagan may refer to:

Sports
 Michael Flanagan (cricketer) (1842–1890), English cricketer
 Mike Flanagan (American football) (born 1973), American football center
 Mike Flanagan (baseball) (1951–2011), former pitcher and television broadcaster
 Mike Flanagan (footballer) (born 1952), English former professional footballer and manager

Others
 Michael Flanagan (councillor) (1833–1931), Irish nationalist councillor
 Michael P. Flanagan (educator) (active since 2005), State Superintendent in Michigan
 Michael Patrick Flanagan (born 1962), American politician and former United States Representative from Illinois
 Mike Flanagan (Irish-Israeli soldier) (1926–2014), British soldier who stole two tanks and deserted to join the Israeli tank corps
 Mike Flanagan (filmmaker) (born 1978), American film director
 Micky Flanagan, English comedian
 Mike Flanagan, banjo player for the Flanagan Brothers
 Mike Flanagan, a character in My Brother's Husband